Talk of This Town is the debut studio album by Northern Irish country music singer and songwriter Catherine McGrath. It was released on 27 July 2018 through Warner Bros. Records. The album was recorded in Nashville and London with a number of producers and co-writers including Steve Robson, Jimmy Robbins (Keith Urban), Liz Rose (Taylor Swift), Forest Glen Whitehead (Kelsea Ballerini) and Sam Ellis (Hunter Hayes).

Chart performance
In the United Kingdom, Talk of This Town debuted at number 13 on the UK Albums Chart, selling 3,839 units in its first week.

Promotion
On 30 April 2018 McGrath announced, through her official Instagram account, her first headlining the Talk of Your Town Tour which will take place throughout the UK. The tour will begin on 14 September in Portsmouth and conclude on 26 September in Glasgow.

Track listing

Notes
  signifies an additional producer

Charts

Release history

References

Catherine McGrath albums
2018 debut albums
Albums produced by Jon Maguire
Warner Records albums
Albums produced by Steve Robson